Hibbertia verrucosa is a species of flowering plant in the family Dilleniaceae and is endemic to the south-west of Western Australia. It is a shrub with scattered, densely hairy, narrowly rectangular leaves and yellow flowers usually with ten stamens fused at the bases, all on one side of two densely softly-hairy carpels.

Description
There are usually ten stamens, curving over two softly-hairy carpels that each contain two ovules. Flowering mostly occurs between August and December.

Taxonomy
This hibbertia was first formally described in 1852 by Nikolai Turczaninow who gave it the name Pleurandra verrucosa in the Bulletin de la Société Impériale des Naturalistes de Moscou from specimens collected by James Drummond. In 1863, George Bentham changed the name to Hibbertia verrucosa in Flora Australiensis. The specific epithet (verrucosa) means "covered with warts".

Distribution and habitat
This species grows in kwongan and heath on rocky outcrops and in sandpalins between Two Peoples Bay and the Cape Arid National Park with scattered populations in nearby areas, in the Avon Wheatbelt, Esperance Plains, Jarrah Forest and Mallee biogeographic regions of south-western Western Australia.

Conservation status
Hibbertia verrucosa is classified as "not threatened" by the Western Australian Government Department of Parks and Wildlife.

See also
List of Hibbertia species

References

verrucosa
Flora of Western Australia
Plants described in 1852
Taxa named by Nikolai Turczaninow